John Goodricke FRS (17 September 1764 – 20 April 1786) was an English amateur astronomer. He is best known for his observations of the variable star Algol (Beta Persei) in 1782.

Life and work 
John Goodricke, named after his great-grandfather Sir John Goodricke 1617–1670 (see Goodricke baronets of Ribston Hall), was born in Groningen in the Netherlands, but lived most of his life in England. He became deaf in early childhood due to a severe illness. His parents sent him to Thomas Braidwood's Academy, a school for deaf pupils in Edinburgh, and in 1778 to the Warrington Academy.

After leaving Warrington, Goodricke returned to live with his parents in York. There, he became friends with his neighbour Edward Pigott, whose father Nathaniel Pigott had built a sophisticated private observatory. Edward was already interested in variable stars, and he gave Goodricke a list of those that he thought were worthy of observation.

Goodricke is credited with discovering the periodic variation of β Lyrae and δ Cephei, the prototypical example of the Cepheid variable stars.

Although several stars were already known to vary in apparent magnitude, Goodricke was the first to propose a mechanism to account for this. He suggested that Algol is what is now known as an eclipsing binary. He presented his findings to the Royal Society in May 1783, and for this work, the Society awarded him the Copley Medal for that year. He was elected a Fellow of the Royal Society on 16 April 1786. He never learned of this honour however, as he died four days later from pneumonia. He never married.

Goodricke in Yorkshire 

Goodricke was buried at Hunsingore Church in Yorkshire, along with many of his relatives.

Today there is a marker in York near the site of John Goodricke's observatory.

Between October 2005 and March 2006 Sean Ellingham and James Valner from the University of York undertook a project to find the position of Goodricke's observatory using the data he recorded. A 1949 study by Sidney Melmore had shown that Goodricke worked from the Treasurer's House (now owned by the National Trust) very near York Minster. By re-creating Goodricke's observations, the two York students were able to conclude that he had observed from the easternmost window of the second floor, looking south towards the Minster.  However, records indicate that the Goodricke family had rented rooms from Edward Topham, the then owner of the northwest wing of the house.

Goodricke College at the University of York is named after Goodricke. There is also a modern sculpture named Algol in the grounds.

Honors
Asteroid 3116 Goodricke is named for John Goodricke.

The University of York has a Goodricke College named after John Goodricke.

The Goodricke-Pigott Observatory is a private astronomical observatory in Tucson, Arizona, named after the two late-eighteenth century astronomers and friends who lived in York, England, John Goodricke and Edward Pigott. It was formally dedicated on 26 October 1996, and observations began that evening with imaging of Comet Hale–Bopp.

In 2012 a non-profit organisation named after John Goodricke was established in Armenia by a group of amateur astronomers.

In 1984 a planetarium show about John Goodricke was created specifically for deaf students by the HOSS Planetarium.

References

Further reading

External links 
  Features animations of different types of variable stars.
 
  Features scans of his notes retrieved from the York City Archives and other biographical information. Website in Norwegian, scans in English.
 
-   See also  John Burnside's poem, 'Sense Data', a tribute to Goodricke in Burnside's collection, The Asylum Dance, Cape (2000)

1764 births
1786 deaths
Scientists from Groningen (city)
18th-century British astronomers
Recipients of the Copley Medal
Fellows of the Royal Society
Enlightenment scientists
Deaths from pneumonia in the United Kingdom
English deaf people
Scientists from Yorkshire
Scientists with disabilities